Stigmella aceris is a moth of the family Nepticulidae found in Europe. It was first described by Heinrich Frey in 1857.

The moth flies from May to June and again in August depending on the location and has a wingspan of 3.7–4.7 mm.

Larvae mine the leaves of its food plant making a narrow corridor usually filling the entire width of the corridor with frass. Eggs are laid on field maple (Acer campestre), Amur maple (A. ginnala), Norway maple (A. platanoides) and Tatarian maple (A. tataricum). There is some debate as to whether the moth mines the leaves of sycamore ([[Acer pseudoplatanus|A. pseudoplatanus]]) with Plant Parasites of Europe stating that it is never found on sycamore and UKmoths'' stating it is found on sycamore.

References

External links
 
Species info
Lepidoptera of Belgium

Nepticulidae
Moths described in 1857
Moths of Europe
Taxa named by Heinrich Frey